Elections to Hastings Borough Council were held on 4 May 2006. Half of the council was up for election and the Conservative Party gained overall control of the council from no overall control. Overall turnout was 37.6%.
After the election, the composition of the council was:
Conservative 17
Labour 10
Liberal Democrat 5

Election result

Ward results

References
2006 Hastings election result
Ward results
News and Views from Election 2006

2006
2006 English local elections
2000s in East Sussex